The 59th Primetime Emmy Awards were held on Sunday, September 16, 2007, honoring the best in U.S. prime time television programming at the Shrine Auditorium in Los Angeles, California. The ceremony was televised live on Fox at 8:00 p.m. EDT for the first time in high definition (on tape delay three hours later on the West Coast of the United States at 8:00 p.m.). It was also the most recent Primetime Emmy Awards ceremony to be held at the Shrine Auditorium, as it was then relocated to the Nokia Theater from the following year (PDT/3:00 UTC). The ceremony was hosted by Ryan Seacrest.

The ceremonies were supposed to be produced by Nigel Lythgoe and Ken Warwick, executive producers of American Idol, but because of their heavy work load with Idol, Ken Ehrlich, last year's producer, resumed the producer's role for the fourth time. Ratings plunged further down to a near an all-time low as an estimate 12.87 million, 19% lower than the past year, making it the second smallest television audience in Emmy history, behind the 1990 telecast.

The nominations were announced on July 19 at 5:40 a.m. PDT (12:40 UTC) by Jon Cryer and Kyra Sedgwick.

Meanwhile, the Creative Arts Emmy Awards ceremony, hosted by comedian-actor Carlos Mencia, were presented eight days earlier on September 9.

Freshman series 30 Rock defeated defending champion The Office to claim Outstanding Comedy Series; this was the only major award for 30 Rock.

Going into its final ceremony, The Sopranos needed just three major awards to tie the drama series record of 18 major wins set by Hill Street Blues. It was nominated in ten major categories coming in and ended the night with three wins, including its second win for Outstanding Drama Series. This tied the record and gave both shows identical résumés—18 major wins and 74 major nominations.  This win for The Sopranos was also the first time any show's sixth season had won for the Outstanding Drama award, later achieved by Game of Thrones as well, another HBO drama.

AMC, a smaller cable network, won big with Broken Trail winning three Emmys. It won Best Miniseries and the network's first Acting wins, for the series' stars, Thomas Haden Church and Robert Duvall.

Winners and nominees

Winners are listed first and highlighted in bold:

Programs

Acting

Lead performances

Supporting performances

Directing

Writing

Most major nominations
By network 
 HBO – 33
 NBC – 28
 ABC – 21
 CBS – 11

By program
 The Sopranos (HBO) – 10
 The Office (NBC) – 7
 Grey's Anatomy (ABC) – 5
 30 Rock (NBC) / Broken Trail (AMC) / Bury My Heart at Wounded Knee (HBO) – 6
 Ugly Betty (ABC) – 4

Most major awards
By network 
 ABC / HBO / NBC – 6
 AMC / PBS – 3

By program
 Broken Trail (AMC) / Prime Suspect: The Final Act (PBS) / The Sopranos (HBO) – 3

Notes

Presenters
The awards were presented by the following:

Interactive TV
Al Gore's Current TV was presented with the Interactive TV Emmy by Masi Oka of Heroes with the help of MySpace's president Tom Anderson. This was the first year the Emmy was presented during the Primetime awards ceremony.

In Memoriam

 Jane Wyatt
 Tige Andrews
 Joseph Barbera
 Roscoe Lee Browne
 Edward Albert Jr.
 Yvonne De Carlo
 Mike Evans
 Sidney Sheldon
 Calvert DeForest
 Glenn Ford
 Arthur Hill
 Bob Carroll Jr.
 Beverly Sills
 Ed Friendly
 Mel Shavelson
 James Glennon
 Don Herbert
 Stan Daniels
 Barbara McNair
 Stuart Rosenberg
 Tommy Newsom
 Steve Irwin
 Joel Siegel
 Peter Boyle
 Charles Nelson Reilly
 Jack Palance
 Jane Wyman
 Tom Poston
 Tom Snyder
 Ed Bradley
 Luciano Pavarotti
 Merv Griffin

Memorable moments
The stage design for the ceremony was created with seating surrounding platform creating a theatre in the round with a "catwalk" style walkway for winners and presenters to exit the stage to. A trap door was placed in the center of the main stage. Some TV critics viewed this as a reference to Fox's American Idol. During his acceptance speech, James Spader made a comment about the seating design, stating that "I've been to thousands and thousands of concerts in my life and I can tell you these are the worst seats I've ever had."

Opening number
As part of the opening number of the ceremony, Brian and Stewie Griffin, two characters of the Fox animated series Family Guy and  both voiced by Seth MacFarlane sang a song: recapping memorable moments of the past television season while noting the variety of programming that will come to the future in the song "You Can Find It on TV", a television-themed version of the song "The FCC Song" from the show's Emmy-nominated episode "PTV".

The Don't Forget the Lyrics mock-contest
Another segment occurred during the presentation of the Outstanding Reality-Competition Program award. There was a competition between singer Kanye West (who attended the ceremony in retaliation for his loss at MTV's Video Music Awards earlier that month) and The Office actor Rainn Wilson similar to Don't Forget the Lyrics! (which, like the 2007 Emmys, airs on Fox) with host Wayne Brady presiding. West sang the last line of the chorus in the song "Stronger" as "That how long I've been on you" which was supposed to be "That how long I've been on ya", losing to Wilson. West jokingly retorted "I never win", poking fun at his losses at award ceremonies and presented the award alongside Wilson.

Steppin' Out With My Baby
Tony Bennett and Christina Aguilera sang "Steppin' Out With My Baby" from Bennett's award-winning special.

Award for Outstanding Lead Actor in a Comedy Series

Jon Stewart and Stephen Colbert presented the award for Outstanding Lead Actor in a Comedy Series. The award went to Ricky Gervais for Extras, but after reading his name, Jon Stewart was informed that Gervais was not at the ceremony. Stewart immediately announced, "Ricky Gervais couldn't be here tonight, so instead we're going to give this to our friend Steve Carell" (who had been nominated for his role on The Office). Carell ran onto the stage and hugged Stewart and Colbert as they all screamed in mock celebration, then ran off together with the award. As a joke, in 2008, at the 60th Primetime Emmy Awards, Ricky Gervais showed a video of the moment, commenting, "Look at [Carell's] stupid face," accusing Carell of "stealing" his award, and demanding it back. He approached Carell, who was sitting straight-faced in the front row, and repeated, "Give me my Emmy," over and over, even going so far as to tickle Carell, until Carell produced the statue from under his seat.

Censorship controversy

During the Fox telecast, some presenters and award winners were censored while making statements. When Ray Romano delivered a comic monologue about the change of television in the years since he left his own show, he mentioned that "for one, from what I hear, Frasier is screwing my wife?". On Fox, all that was heard was "for one, from what I hear, Frasier is" before Fox cut the audio and replaced the feed with pre-recorded material of an LED display ball with text scrolling around it. When viewers saw the ball through a high camera angle, it is revealed that the ball covered the entire stage. This lasted approximately 10 seconds before Fox returned to Romano. The reason for the censorship of this comment has been debated between vulgar language or revealing an important plot line to the show.

When Katherine Heigl accepted her award for Outstanding Supporting Actress in a Drama Series, she accidentally used profanity in her speech, causing Fox to cut the audio and once again replaced its feed with the pre-recorded shot of the display ball, only to return a moment later.

The biggest censorship controversy was when actress Sally Field accepted her Emmy for Outstanding Lead Actress in a Drama Series. After giving an acceptance speech which included anti-war statements, partially as a tribute to her Brothers & Sisters character Nora Walker, the audience applauded before she was finished and Field, finding herself lost for words, couldn't remember what she was going to say. When she regained her words, she concluded her speech with "If mothers ruled the world, there would be no goddamn wars in the first place." Fox had cut to the display ball as she began to say "goddamn". This remark, and Fox's censorship of the remark, caused controversy in the days following the ceremony, leading critics to wonder if Fox had censored "Goddamn" or "Goddamn wars". Field's remarks caused Fox to implement a four-second delay for the remainder of the telecast. All of these comments were left uncensored on CTV in Canada, and other international simulcasts.

Also, at the Creative Arts Awards ceremony eight days earlier, Kathy Griffin, who won for Kathy Griffin: My Life on the D-List caused controversy in her acceptance speech after she denounced celebrities who thank Jesus for their awards. She later concluded her speech with an off-color joke that included "Suck it, Jesus! This award is my God now!" The Catholic League condemned her comments and successfully convinced E! to censor her speech during the telecast the following Saturday.

References

External links
 Primetime Emmy Awards
 Emmy Awards coverage on DigitalHit.com
 Emmys.com list of 2007 Nominees & Winners
 
 "You Can Find It on TV" opening number with partial lyrics

059
Daytime Emmy Awards
2007 in Los Angeles
September 2007 events in the United States